Gunborg Åhling (born 16 July 1936) is a Swedish orienteering competitor. She competed at the very first World Orienteering Championships, in Fiskars in 1966, where she won a gold medal in the relay together with Kerstin Granstedt and Eivor Steen-Olsson, and placed tenth in the individual contest.

References

1936 births
Living people
Swedish orienteers
Female orienteers
Foot orienteers
World Orienteering Championships medalists
20th-century Swedish women